The M77 motorway is a motorway in Scotland. It begins in Glasgow at the M8 motorway at Kinning Park, and terminates near Kilmarnock at Fenwick, becoming the A77 dual carriageway. Changes were made in 2005 segregating a lane on the M8 motorway almost as far as the Kingston Bridge, which in January 2006 was extended further onto the bridge itself. It forms the most northerly part of the A77 trunk road which links Glasgow to Stranraer in the South West of Scotland. (The A77 itself continues to Portpatrick in Dumfries and Galloway.)

History 

The original M77 was a short  spur route which took traffic from the M8 motorway in the Kinning Park area of Glasgow, ending at a roundabout on Dumbreck Road close to Bellahouston Park, although prior to this there had been an unused spur running to roughly Ibrox telephone exchange on Gower Street.

A large number of accidents and pollution problems caused in the suburban towns of Giffnock and Newton Mearns by commuter traffic and heavy lorries (the A77 is the main route for ferry-bound traffic sailing to Northern Ireland), saw an extension being built to the motorway in 1994 to bypass these areas, which was opened in 1997. This was fiercely opposed by environmentalists, who set up a road protest camp, as it meant that the motorway would cut through the historic Pollok Country Park. Approval for the extension was granted and construction went ahead. A threatening visit in 1995 to the protesters of 'Pollok Free State' by the Conservative Member of Parliament Allan Stewart (then the MP for Eastwood, the constituency including Newton Mearns, which the new road would bypass), accompanied by his airgun-wielding son, resulted in a political shot in the foot, contributing to his subsequent resignation, and a fine for his son in Paisley Sheriff Court. The Conservatives lost the Eastwood seat in the next election in 1997.

This replaced the dangerous 4-lane single carriageway of the A77 that dropped to a two lane single carriageway for the bend just north of the very sharp Mearns Road turn-off, and the A77/B764 (Eaglesham) junction (causing vehicles to queue dangerously on the outside lane on a bend to enter the B764 from the south) which were prone to fatal accidents. The scheme also included the Glasgow Southern Orbital (GSO) which bypasses the B764 Eaglesham Moor Road to East Kilbride. This also resulted in the closure of junction 5 on its previous site at Malletsheugh and the creation of a new junction 5 slightly further south at Maidenhill. An old slip road still exists, but is closed. The works were completed in April 2005. 

In 2006, junction 2 was rebuilt in conjunction with the building of the adjacent Silverburn Shopping Centre. The northbound off-ramp and southbound on-ramp are now routed via the access roundabout to the shopping centre.

In 2010 a relief lane was constructed between Plantation and Junction 1 southbound. The purpose of this was to ease the congestion that regularly occurs during peak rush hour.

The original segment of the A77 between Newton Mearns and Fenwick that previously carried the traffic now accommodated by the M77 has been converted into a two-lane single carriageway with cycle lanes. The remainder of the road through Newton Mearns has been converted into a two-lane dual carriageway with cycle lanes. The cycle lanes end at Eastwood Toll in Giffnock.

Junctions  
{| class="plainrowheaders wikitable"
|-
!scope=col|Council area
!scope=col|Location
!scope=col|mi
!scope=col|km
!scope=col|Junction
!scope=col|Destinations
!scope=col|Notes
|-
|rowspan="4"|Glasgow
|rowspan="4"|Glasgow
|0
|0
| bgcolor="ffdddd" |—
| bgcolor="ffdddd" |  - Glasgow, Edinburgh 
| bgcolor="ffdddd" |no Westbound exit or Southbound entrance from West
|-
|1.1
|1.7
|1
|B768 - Dumbreck, Mosspark
|
|-
|2.8
|4.5
|2
|B762 - Shawlands, Hurlet
|
|-
|4.2
|6.7
|3
|  - Paisley, Hurlet  - Thornliebank, Giffnock
|
|-
|rowspan="2"|East Renfrewshire
|rowspan="2"|Newton Mearns
|5.8
|9.3
| bgcolor="ffdddd" |4
| bgcolor="ffdddd" |B7087 - Crookfur (Newton Mearns)
| bgcolor="ffdddd" |no Southbound entrance or Northbound exit
|-
|7.7
|12.4
|5
|  - East Kilbride, Strathaven   - Newton Mearns, Giffnock, Glasgow
|
|-
|rowspan="3"|East Ayrshire
|rowspan="3"|—
|12.8
|20.6
| bgcolor="ffdddd" |6
| bgcolor="ffdddd" |  - Kilmarnock, Newton Mearns, Glasgow
| bgcolor="ffdddd" |no Southbound entrance or Northbound exit
|-
|15.2
|24.5
| bgcolor="ffdddd" |7
| bgcolor="ffdddd" |  - Kilmarnock, Newton Mearns, GlasgowB778 - Stewarton, Fenwick
| bgcolor="ffdddd" |no Northbound exit
|-
|16.3
|26.3
| bgcolor="ffdddd" |8
| bgcolor="ffdddd" |  - Ayr, StranraerB7038 - KilmarnockB7061 - Fenwick
| bgcolor="ffdddd" |Southbound exit only, Northbound entrance only from A77

Coordinate list

See also 
 List of motorways in the United Kingdom

References

External links 

Glasgow Motorway Archive - The M77 Motorway
 The Motorway Archive – M77

Motorways in Scotland
Transport in East Ayrshire
Transport in East Renfrewshire
Transport in Glasgow
Anti-road protest
Newton Mearns
Pollokshields